Gorgonomyces is a genus of fungi belonging to the family Gorgonomycetaceae.

Species:
 Gorgonomyces haynaldii (Schaarschm.) Letcher

References

Chytridiomycota
Chytridiomycota genera